The 2020 Australian Open was a Grand Slam tennis tournament that took place at Melbourne Park, from 20 January to 2 February 2020. It was the 108th edition of the Australian Open, the 52nd in the Open Era, and the first Grand Slam of the year. The tournament consisted of events for professional players in singles, doubles and mixed doubles. Junior and wheelchair players competed in singles and doubles tournaments. As in previous years, the tournament's main sponsor was Kia.

Novak Djokovic and Naomi Osaka were the defending champions in Men's Singles and Women's Singles, respectively. Osaka lost in the third round to Coco Gauff. In contrast, Djokovic successfully defended his title by defeating Dominic Thiem to win the tournament for a record-extending eighth time.

Prior to this edition of the Australian Open, the supplier of the hard courts was changed to GreenSet, though the court surface and color remained the same.

Tournament

The 2020 Australian Open was the 108th edition of the tournament, held at Melbourne Park in Melbourne, Victoria, Australia.

The tournament is run by the International Tennis Federation (ITF) and is part of the 2020 ATP Tour and the 2020 WTA Tour calendars under the Grand Slam category. The tournament consists of both men's and women's singles and doubles draws as well as the mixed doubles events. There are singles and doubles events for both boys and girls (players under 18), which are part of the Grade A category of tournaments. There are also singles, doubles and quad events for men's and women's wheelchair tennis players as part of the NEC tour under the Grand Slam category.

The tournament is played on hard courts and is taking place across a series of 25 courts, the three main show courts Rod Laver Arena, Melbourne Arena and Margaret Court Arena. 1573 Arena (formerly Show Court Two) was upgraded into a main show court.

Impact of bushfires 
The bushfires that had burned large portions of Australia for months left a smoke haze over Melbourne on the first day of qualifying. That day, the air over Melbourne was rated as the worst in the world. In qualifying, play was delayed, some players called for medical timeouts, and Dalila Jakupović was forced to retire, due to a coughing fit brought on by the poor air quality.

The tournament held a Rally for Relief similar to the one of 2011 before the tournament to raise money to stop the bushfires. Novak Djokovic, Coco Gauff, Petra Kvitová, Rafael Nadal, Naomi Osaka, Dominic Thiem, Stefanos Tsitsipas, and Alexander Zverev all played a doubles format match with Serena Williams and Caroline Wozniacki as team captains. Roger Federer and Nick Kyrgios later played a one set singles match where Federer prevailed.

Singles players
Men's singles

Women's singles

Events

Men's singles

 Novak Djokovic def.  Dominic Thiem, 6–4, 4–6, 2–6, 6–3, 6–4

Women's singles

 Sofia Kenin def.  Garbiñe Muguruza, 4–6, 6–2, 6–2

Men's doubles

 Rajeev Ram /  Joe Salisbury def.  Max Purcell /  Luke Saville, 6–4, 6–2

Women's doubles

 Tímea Babos /  Kristina Mladenovic def.  Hsieh Su-wei /  Barbora Strýcová, 6–2, 6–1

Mixed doubles

 Barbora Krejčíková /  Nikola Mektić def.  Bethanie Mattek-Sands /  Jamie Murray, 5–7, 6–4, [10–1]

Wheelchair men's singles

 Shingo Kunieda def.  Gordon Reid, 6–4, 6–4

Wheelchair women's singles

 Yui Kamiji def.  Aniek van Koot, 6–2, 6–2

Wheelchair quad singles

 Dylan Alcott def.  Andy Lapthorne, 6–0, 6–4

Wheelchair men's doubles

 Alfie Hewett /  Gordon Reid def.  Stéphane Houdet /  Nicolas Peifer, 4–6, 6–4, [10–7]

Wheelchair women's doubles

 Yui Kamiji /  Jordanne Whiley def.  Diede de Groot /  Aniek van Koot, 6–2, 6–4

Wheelchair quad doubles

 Dylan Alcott /  Heath Davidson def.  Andy Lapthorne /  David Wagner, 6–4, 6–3

Boys' singles

 Harold Mayot def.  Arthur Cazaux, 6–4, 6–1

Girls' singles

 Victoria Jiménez Kasintseva def.  Weronika Baszak, 5–7, 6–2, 6–2

Boys' doubles

 Nicholas David Ionel /  Leandro Riedi def.  Mikołaj Lorens /  Kārlis Ozoliņš, 6–7(8–10), 7–5, [10–4]

Girls' doubles

 Alex Eala /  Priska Madelyn Nugroho def.  Živa Falkner /  Matilda Mutavdzic, 6–1, 6–2

Point distribution and prize money

Point distribution
Below is a series of tables for each of the competitions showing the ranking points offered for each event.

Senior points

Wheelchair points

Junior points

Prize money
The Australian Open total prize money for 2020 was increased by 13.6% to a tournament record A$71,000,000.

1Qualifiers prize money was also the Round of 128 prize money.
*per team

References

External links

 Australian Open official website

 
 

 
2020 ATP Tour
2020 in Australian tennis
2020 WTA Tour
January 2020 sports events in Australia
February 2020 sports events in Australia